Martha Biilmann (1921-2008) was a Greenlandic furrier known for her expertise in animal skins and their care. She worked as a consultant for the government of Greenland and a teacher in several institutions. Throughout her career, she promoted awareness and education about traditional methods of working with sealskin. In 1990, Biilmann published Amminik Suleriaaseq, a guide to sealskin.

In recognition of her work, Biilmann was awarded the Danish Medal of Merit and Greenlandic Nersornaat. She also received the Greenlandic Culture Prize in 1988.

References

External links 
 Interview with Martha Biilmann on KNR, 1986 (in Greenlandic)

1921 births
Greenlandic people
2008 deaths
Furriers
Women educators
Greenlandic educators
Greenlandic women